Neil McVicar was a Canadian politician from the province of Saskatchewan. He represented Rosetown as a Liberal on the Legislative Assembly from 1934 to 1944.

References

External links 

 Saskatchewan Archives Board – Saskatchewan Election Results By Electoral Division

See also 

 8th Saskatchewan Legislature
 9th Saskatchewan Legislature

Saskatchewan Liberal Party MLAs
People from Rosetown